The Earth Will Shake may mean:

The Earth Will Shake, the first novel in Robert Anton Wilson's The Historical Illuminatus Chronicles
"The Earth Will Shake," a song on Thrice's album Vheissu